Simon Azoulay Pedersen (born 14 December 1982) is a former Danish professional football player, who played as a striker. From 1998 to 2001, he played 22 games and scored five goals for Denmark in different age levels.

External links
 Profile on TPS.fi
 Profile on sif-support.dk
 National team profile on dbu.dk

1982 births
Living people
Danish men's footballers
Denmark youth international footballers
Boldklubben af 1893 players
Akademisk Boldklub players
Esbjerg fB players
Silkeborg IF players
Turun Palloseura footballers
Chirag United Club Kerala players
Danish Superliga players
Veikkausliiga players
I-League players
Danish expatriate men's footballers
Expatriate footballers in Finland
Danish expatriate sportspeople in Finland
Expatriate footballers in India
Danish expatriate sportspeople in India
Association football forwards
Footballers from Copenhagen